The Client List is an American television film that premiered on the Lifetime Network on July 19, 2010. It starred Jennifer Love Hewitt and was directed by Eric Laneuville. The film is a fictionalized dramatization of a 2004 prostitution scandal in Odessa, Texas. It follows Sam Horton, a mother of three who becomes a prostitute to meet her financial obligations.

Plot
Samantha and Rex Horton are unemployed and struggling to provide for their three children and keep their home. Desperate to stave off foreclosure, Samantha takes a job at a massage parlor, but quickly learns it is a house of prostitution, with the internal motto "beats the hell out of waitressing". As the Hortons are down to their last dollar, Samantha stays, and quickly becomes one of the most popular employees, being very personable with her clients.

While her earnings increase, she hides the true nature of her job from her family and friends, even while lavishing them with expensive gifts. Rex later finds work again himself. Sam's popularity causes another problem: exhaustion, affecting her relationships. One of her clients gives her cocaine to keep her going.

Meanwhile, a very young masseuse has revealed the true nature of the parlor to a church group, and public pressure on the mayor, who is up for re-election, leads to a police raid, even though many on the force are also clients. Sam's arrest is shown live on television at the bar Rex frequents. Her drug supply is also found, leading to an additional charge for possession.

Sam is bailed out of jail by her close friend Dee, the only one she confided in about her real job. She berates her for not having the courage to drop the job after her needs were met. Rex and Sam separate. Another friend, Laura, a lawyer, convinces Sam to form a "client list" of the more prominent "johns". Their cooperation gets Sam and co-workers light jail sentences.

After her release from jail, Samantha is confronted by several of the clients' wives—who are looking for advice on how to improve their marriages. Attempting to move on, she becomes a waitress and goes back to college, hoping to patch things up with Rex.

Cast

 Jennifer Love Hewitt as Samantha "Sam" Horton
 Teddy Sears as Rex Horton
 Sonja Bennett as Dee
 Lynda Boyd as Jackie
 Chelah Horsdal as Doreen
 Heather Doerksen as Tanya
 Kacey Rohl as Emma
 Kandyse McClure as Laura
 Cybill Shepherd as Cassie

Reception

Ratings
The Client List drew in an audience of 3.9 million viewers and was the highest rated program for the evening amongst female viewers between the ages of 18 and 49.

Critical response
On Rotten Tomatoes it has an approval rating of 83% based on reviews from 6 critics.

Entertainment Weeklys Ken Tucker considered it a typical Lifetime film that "offer[ed] cheap thrills … while offering moral uplift." Calling it "malarkey," he felt that Hewitt was able to sell the film to the audiences due to her "talent for communicating sincerity and charm."

Awards and nominations

The film received a Golden Globe nomination for Jennifer Love Hewitt in the category "Best Performance by an Actress in a Mini-Series or Motion Picture Made for Television," but lost to Claire Danes starring as Temple Grandin in the film of the same name.

Home media
The film was released on DVD in January 2011 in North America.

Television series

On August 10, 2011, it was announced that Lifetime had ordered production of The Client List television series based on the film. Hewitt acted as the lead role and also served as an executive producer. The series was a re-imagination of the film (with Hewitt's character having a different name from the film), and was not a direct continuation of the film's story line. The series premiered on April 8, 2012. On November 1, 2013, Lifetime cancelled the series after two seasons; the final episode of the series aired on June 16, 2013.

References

External links 
 
 
 

2010 television films
2010 films
American drama films
Films about prostitution in the United States
Films directed by Eric Laneuville
Lifetime (TV network) films
2010s American films